The 1999 Nottingham Open was an ATP tournament held in Nottingham, Great Britain. The tournament was part of the ATP World Series of the 1999 ATP Tour and was held from 14 to 21 June 1999.

Cédric Pioline won his only title of the year and the fourth of his career.

Finals

Singles

 Cédric Pioline defeated  Kevin Ullyett, 6–3, 7–5

Doubles

 Patrick Galbraith /  Justin Gimelstob defeated  Marius Barnard /  Brent Haygarth, 5–7, 7–5, 6–3

References

 
Nottingham
Nottingham Open